Greyhound racing is a popular sport in Ireland. There are 17 stadiums operating in Ireland (two in Northern Ireland) of which nine are fully operated by Rásaíocht Con Éireann / Greyhound Racing Ireland (formerly named Irish Greyhound Board IGB,  Bord na gCon) with the remaining six owned and operated by private enterprise but licensed by GRI.

Most have modern facilities including grandstand restaurants and parimutuel betting tote system with on-course and off-course betting available.

History
Greyhound racing as it is seen today evolved from a sport called coursing. In 1926 the oval form of racing arrived in Britain at Belle Vue Stadium in Manchester which resulted in the creation of hundreds of tracks all over the United Kingdom and Ireland in the following ten years.

The sport of greyhound racing in Ireland mainly takes place in the Republic of Ireland but also in Northern Ireland. However, any tracks in Northern Ireland have always been in a regulatory limbo due to the fact that they are licensed neither by the Greyhound Board of Great Britain (GBGB) nor Greyhound Racing Ireland (named Bord na gCon until 2020).

To confuse matters still further, the industry regards racing as either UK or Irish, the latter including Northern Ireland. Greyhound Racing Ireland provides all of the results from Northern Ireland. The vast majority of greyhounds running in the UK are bred in Ireland (95% in 2017).

In recent years, the industry has come under scrutiny regarding the welfare of greyhounds, multiple newspaper articles have reported various stories primarily about the greyhounds that are bred and not used in racing and racing greyhounds after they retire from racing. This led to new legislation and the Irish government creating the Greyhound Racing Act 2019. The Rásaíocht Con Éireann are required to conduct a range of inspections under the Welfare of Greyhounds Act including a traceability system.

Stadiums
 Clonmel (Private)
 Cork (GRI)
 Derry (N Ireland)
 Drumbo Park (N Ireland)
 Dundalk (Private)
 Enniscorthy (Private)
 Galway (GRI)
 Kilkenny (Private)
 Limerick (GRI)
 Longford (Private)
 Mullingar (GRI)
 Newbridge (GRI)
 Shelbourne Park (GRI)
 Thurles (Private)
 Tralee (GRI)
 Waterford (GRI)
 Youghal (GRI)

Competitions
There are many types of competitions in Ireland but the primary race is the Irish Greyhound Derby held at Shelbourne Park. Along with the English Greyhound Derby it is considered to be one of the "Big Two" in greyhound racing.

Greyhound Racing Ireland publishes an annual list of feature events. Leading events include the Easter Cup, Champion Stakes, Cesarewitch, Oaks, Laurels and St Leger.

General information

Graded racing
This is any minor race staged at a track, with prize money varying widely. This kind of racing is the most common at the various stadia.

Racing jacket colours
Greyhound racing in Ireland has a standard colour scheme (the same as in the UK).

 Trap 1 = Red with White numeral
 Trap 2 = Blue with White numeral
 Trap 3 = White with Black numeral
 Trap 4 = Black with White numeral
 Trap 5 = Orange with Black numeral
 Trap 6 = Black & White Stripes with Red numeral

A racing jacket worn by a reserve bears an additional letter 'R' shown prominently on each side.

References

External links
Greyhound Racing Ireland
Greyhound Data